Zita Bálint (born 25 November 1971) is a Hungarian athlete. She competed in the women's triple jump at the 1996 Summer Olympics.

References

1971 births
Living people
Athletes (track and field) at the 1996 Summer Olympics
Hungarian female triple jumpers
Olympic athletes of Hungary
Place of birth missing (living people)